Hyloxalus borjai is a species of frog in the family Dendrobatidae. It is endemic to Colombia and only known from its type locality, Amalfi, Antioquia, on the Cordillera Central at  asl.
Its natural habitats are sub-Andean forests. Very little is known about this species.

References

borjai
Amphibians of the Andes
Amphibians of Colombia
Endemic fauna of Colombia
Taxa named by Marco Antonio Serna Díaz
Taxa named by Juan A. Rivero
Amphibians described in 2000
Taxonomy articles created by Polbot